Aarhus Gymnastikforening (AGF or AGF Aarhus) is one of the oldest sport clubs in Denmark. The club was founded in 1880, mainly with Gymnastics but also Fencing as the main sports, though AGF later introduced a variety of other activities in both individual and team sports.

Competitions

Danish Superliga

DBU Pokalen

External links
Official website in English
Official website for the football department
Official Fanclub
GF-Forum,Unofficial messageboard
Unofficial Fanclub

Aarhus Gymnastikforening
AGF